Rustem Kazakov (born 2 January 1947) is a former Soviet wrestler of Crimean Tatar heritage, Olympic Champion, born in Tashkent, Uzbek SSR and affiliated with VS Tashkent.

He competed at the 1972 Summer Olympics in Munich where he won a gold medal in Greco-Roman wrestling, the bantamweight class. 
He is also two times world champion in 1969 and 1971.

References

1947 births
Living people
Sportspeople from Tashkent
Soviet male sport wrestlers
Olympic wrestlers of the Soviet Union
Wrestlers at the 1972 Summer Olympics
Uzbekistani male sport wrestlers
Olympic gold medalists for the Soviet Union
Olympic medalists in wrestling
Medalists at the 1972 Summer Olympics
Honoured Masters of Sport of the USSR